Chinchillani (possibly from Aymara chinchilla a kind of rodent, -ni a suffix, "the one with the chinchilla (or chinchillas)) is a mountain in the Andes of southern  Peru, about  high. It is situated in the Moquegua Region, Mariscal Nieto Province, Torata District, and in the Tacna Region, Candarave Province, Camilaca District. Chinchillani lies southwest of Chuquiananta.

References

Mountains of Peru
Mountains of Moquegua Region
Mountains of Tacna Region